Superegos is a 2014 German drama film directed by Benjamin Heisenberg. The film had its premiere in the Panorama section of the 64th Berlin International Film Festival.

Plot
Nick Gutlicht is a petty thief who lives off dealing in stolen property, namely illegal resale of stolen valuable books. Unfortunately, Nick also owes money to another criminal gang  and needs to conceal his whereabouts from them.  By chance he ends up in the lavish property of famous, elderly former Nazi philosopher Curt Ledig. Despite his periodic amnesia and fear of kitchens, Ledig refuses to move in with  his concerned daughter. Nick is hired by Ledig's daughter and family to act as a caregiver for Nick. Now Curt can work on a presentation for his upcoming symposium, which nobody thinks he can achieve any longer. Nick thinks he has a convenient bolt hole to hide from apprehension for his misdeeds. This partnership of convenience of these two incompatible cohabiting individuals develops into a difficult situation. Curt regards Nick as an ideal research subject and exposes him to repeatedly inexplicable acts of "therapy". For Nick, his new situation represents a unique opportunity to increase his lagging finances with the contents of Curt's  library.

Meanwhile, Nick's casual lover and fence, Norah, is fed up with his internal problems with committing to their relationship.  Nick's criminal creditors are heading toward Ledig's premises at Ammerssee,  led by a dubious older female underworld figure known only as “Mother”. Curt's family has also decided to visit him - and Nick is beginning to experience some positive outcomes  from his involuntary therapeutic episodes with Curt. The fates of the odd couple  become interravelled, until a dramatic therapeutic conclusion in the solitude of an alpine evening leads to a startling resolution.

Cast
 André Wilms as Curt Ledig
 Georg Friedrich as Nick Gutlicht
 Bettina Stucky as Rosa
 Susanne Wolff as Norah
 Elisabeth Orth as Frau Tischmann
 Maria Hofstätter as Mutter
 Margarita Broich as Fanny
 Markus Schleinzer as Jasper
 Michael Wittenborn as Moderator

References

External links
 

2014 films
2014 drama films
German drama films
2010s German-language films
Films directed by Benjamin Heisenberg
2010s German films